Euphaedra clio is a butterfly in the family Nymphalidae. It is found in the southern part of the Republic of the Congo, the Central African Republic and the Democratic Republic of the Congo.

References

Butterflies described in 1981
clio